Radomyos Matjiur (born April 2 1988 in Bangkok) is a Thai swimmer who won a gold medal at the 2013 Southeast Asian Games in the 100 m breaststroke. He currently holds the Thai records in swimming in the 100 m breaststroke, 100 m individual medley, 200 m individual medley and 4×50 m freestyle relay. Matjiur also won the 200 m breaststroke final at the Southeast Asian Games in Singapore. He competes in the 100 m breaststroke at the 2016 Summer Olympics in Rio de Janeiro.

References

1988 births
Living people
Radomyos Matjiur
Radomyos Matjiur
Swimmers at the 2016 Summer Olympics
Radomyos Matjiur
Swimmers at the 2014 Asian Games
Swimmers at the 2018 Asian Games
Southeast Asian Games medalists in swimming
Radomyos Matjiur
Competitors at the 2015 Southeast Asian Games
Radomyos Matjiur
Radomyos Matjiur